Long Island is an island in the Kennebecasis River near Rothesay, New Brunswick. The island is accessible by boat during warm months and by crossing the ice in the winter.

Nature Preserves
The island contains two nature preserves:  Minister's Face Nature Preserve and Rayworth Beach Nature Preserve.

References

River islands of New Brunswick